Last Curtain Call is the final release & concert ever by Norwegian gothic metal band Theatre of Tragedy. It is released both as a DVD with an audio CD included and as a separate double album. It was recorded live in the band's hometown, 17 years to the day they formed. This release was only possible due to the after the label refused to cover all the expenses, forcing the band to resort to fundraising, which according to the band's site was 10,000 Euros were given by the label, 10,000 Euros by the band itself and 4,000 Euros, with the help of fans.

The album version omits two performances that are present on the DVD release (Cassandra and Lorelei).

The DVD audio has two options: Dolby Digital AC-3 Stereo & AC-3 5.1.

DVD Disc 1 Track listing

Notes
  from the album Forever Is the World
  from the album Velvet Darkness They Fear
  from the album Aégis
  from the album Storm
  from the EP A Rose for the Dead
  from the album Musique
  from their self-titled debut album and 1994 demo

No songs from Assembly were played in this concert.

Track 1, 3, 9 and 16 is published by Copyright COntrol
Track 4, 6, 10, 11, 13 and 14 is published by Sylvian Music Gmbh
Track 2, 5, 7, 8, 12 and 15 us published by Hanseatic Musikverlag Gmbh

DVD Disc 2

Live Album Track listing

Credits

Theatre of Tragedy
Nell Sigland - vocals
Raymond Istvàn Rohonyi - vocals
Vegard K. Thorsen - guitar
Frank Claussen - guitar
Lorentz Aspen - keyboards
Hein Frode Hansen - drums, production
Erik Torp - session bass

Other Personnel
Erlend Sørbø - editing, production, direction
Aleksander Nyhus - editing, recording
Lars Martin Kræmer	 - editing, production 
Lise Kvam - design, artwork 
Haakon Hoseth - cover art, design, layout
Alexandre Mattioli - Rehearsal, video, photo

Truls Espedal - cover art painting
Chris Sansom - mastering (at Propeller Mastering)
Mike Hartung - mastering
Alex Møklebust - mixing
Hauke Dressler - engineering

Photography
GothicNarcissus	
Graham Hilling	
Werner SW	        
João Pedro Vieira	
Soledad Garcia

References

http://theatreoftragedy.com/news.php?postID=146022
http://blabbermouth.net/news.aspx?mode=Article&newsitemID=157042
http://heavymetal.about.com/od/dvdreviews/fr/Theatre-Of-Tragedy-Last-Curtain-Call-Dvd-Review.htm
http://www.rocktopia.co.uk/index.php?option=com_content&view=article&catid=910:cd-reviews&id=1397:theatre-of-tragedy-last-curtain-call&Itemid=121
http://www.lordsofmetal.nl/nl/reviews/view/id/19265
http://www.femmemetalwebzine.net/2012/05/29/theatre-of-tragedy-last-curtain-call-2011-live-album/
http://www.musikreviews.de/reviews/2011/Theatre-Of-Tragedy/Last-Curtain-Call-Live/
http://www.rockipedia.no/utgivelser/last_curtain_call-12401/
http://www.nuclearblast.de/en/products/tontraeger/dvd-bluray/dvd-digi-cd/theatre-of-tragedy-the-last-curtain-call.html
http://www.answers.com/topic/theatre-of-tragedy-last-curtain-call

External links
http://theatreoftragedy.com/discography.php
http://www.allmusic.com/artist/theatre-of-tragedy-mn0000924630
http://www.allmusic.com/artist/theatre-of-tragedy-mn0000924630/overview/video#discography
http://www.discogs.com/Theatre-Of-Tragedy-Last-Curtain-Call/release/2954055

Theatre of Tragedy albums